Sangla is a village and former Village Development Committee that is now part of  Tarakeshwar Municipality in Kathmandu District in Province No. 3 of central Nepal. At the time of the 1991 Nepal census it had a population of 2,625 people living in 515 households.

References

Populated places in Kathmandu District